No Fear Racing was a part-time NASCAR Sprint Cup Series team racing the No. 60 SoBe No Fear Energy Drink Ford Fusion driven by Boris Said. It was owned by Frank Stoddard and Mark Simo, owner of the No Fear brand. The team debuted at the 2006 Dodge/Save Mart 350 at Infineon Raceway. The next week, Said won the pole for the Pepsi 400 and finished fourth. Simo Racing's cars were prepared by Roush Fenway Racing.

Heading into the 2009 season, No Fear formed a partnership called Carter/Simo Racing with John Carter Racing to share owner points and resources during the season.  The team would run Carter's No. 08 during the year and Terry Labonte would drive Toyotas for Carter while Boris Said would drive Fords for No Fear.

Prior to the 2011 season, Stoddard would purchase the remaining equipment to form FAS Lane Racing, after it had been used by Latitude 43 Motorsports in 2010 (where Stoddard had been crew chief).

References

External links
Jayski team profile

American auto racing teams
Defunct NASCAR teams
Auto racing teams established in 2006
Auto racing teams disestablished in 2009

de:No Fear Racing